The 2022–2023 mpox outbreak in Australia is a part of the outbreak of human mpox caused by the West African clade of the monkeypox virus. The outbreak reached Australia on 20 May 2022. By 28 October 2022 there were over 140 confirmed cases. The Chief Medical Officer of Australia stood down the country's Communicable Disease Incident of National Significance declaration on 25 November 2022.

Background

Transmission 

A large portion of those infected were believed to have not recently traveled to areas of Africa where mpox is normally found, such as Nigeria, the Democratic Republic of the Congo as well as central and western Africa. It is believed to be transmitted by close contact with sick people, with extra caution for those individuals with lesions on their skin or genitals, along with their bedding and clothing. The CDC has also stated that individuals should avoid contact and consumption of dead animals such as rats, squirrels, monkeys and apes along with wild game or lotions derived from animals in Africa.

In addition to more common symptoms, such as fever, headache, swollen lymph nodes, and rashes or lesions, some patients have also experienced proctitis, an inflammation of the rectum lining. CDC has also warned clinicians to not rule out mpox in patients with sexually transmitted infections since there have been reports of co-infections with syphilis, gonorrhea, chlamydia, and herpes.

History 
The first case was detected on 20 May 2022 by a General Practitioner in Sydney. The patient, a male in his 40s, had recently returned from travelling in Europe and had developed symptoms. The man was placed in isolation while testing was carried out. Shortly afterward another male, in is 30s, who had recently returned from the United Kingdom to Victoria was diagnosed with the disease.

By 26 June 2022 there were six cases in New South Wales and four in Victoria.

By 30 June 2022 the first case of the virus was reported in South Australia, the man tested positive after returning from overseas and was placed in isolation.

Queensland reported the first case on 11 July 2022 with one person testing positive and being placed in isolation and under virtual monitoring in Brisbane.

On 24 July 2022 Australia had recorded a total of 44 cases, by 2 August the number of cases had increased to 53.

The first case was detected in Western Australia on 4 August 2022 in a person who had travelled from overseas. The person was placed in isolation in Perth, Western Australia.

On 5 August 2022 there had been 34 cases of mpox recorded in New South Wales and 57 cases had been recorded nationally.

By 11 August there were 70 confirmed and probable cases in Australia with 33 in New South Wales, 30 in Victoria, 2 in Queensland, 2 in Western Australia, 2 in the Australian Capital Territory and 1 in South Australia.

By 18 August there were 89 confirmed cases in Australia with 40 cases in Victoria, 39 in New South Wales, 3 in Queensland, 3 in Western Australia, 2 in both South Australia and the Australian Capital Territory.

There were 106 confirmed cases of mpox in Australia on the 25th of August with 52 recorded cases in Victoria, 43 cases in New South Wales, 4 in Western Australia, 3 in Queensland, 2 in South Australia and the Australian Capital Territory.

The Chief Medical Officer of Australia stood down the country's Communicable Disease Incident of National Significance declaration on 25 November 2022. At least 140 cases had been reported between May and late October 2022.

See also 

 2022-2023 mpox outbreak

Notes

References

External links

Australia
Mpox
2022 in Australia
Disease outbreaks in Australia